Taunus can refer to the following:

 Taunus, a mountain range in Germany
 Taunus Corporation, the American holding company for Deutsche Bank
 Ford Taunus, a large family car manufactured in Germany by Ford from 1939 to 1982

See also
 Tanus (disambiguation)